The Pakistan women's national cricket team  represents Pakistan in international cricket and is a full member of the International Cricket Council (ICC) with Test and One Day International (ODI) status. They first competed in international cricket in 1997 when they played an ODI against New Zealand. Pakistan lost the match by 10 wickets. They recorded their first ODI win against the Netherlands, in April 2001 at the National Stadium. , Pakistan has played 150 ODI matches; they have won 44 matches and lost 104 matches, whilst two had no result. They have faced 13 teams in ODI cricket, with their most frequent opponent being Sri Lanka, playing 30 matches against them. Pakistan registered more wins against Ireland than any other team, with 12. They have lost to Sri Lanka in 21 matches. Pakistan has participated in three editions of the Women's Cricket World Cup: 1997, 2009 and 2013. In the 2009 edition, they defeated Sri Lanka in the group stage match by 57 runs. They also defeated West Indies in the "Super Six" match by four wickets, and finished at sixth losing in the fifth place playoff to the same team by three wickets.

Pakistan played their first Test match against Sri Lanka in April 1998, a match they lost by 309 runs. They have played three Test matches against three different opponents: Ireland, Sri Lanka and West Indies. , Pakistan has played 82 Twenty20 International (T20I) matches since their first such contest in 2009 against Ireland, winning 32 matches and losing 47; they also tied two match, whilst one had no result. They have competed against 10 different opponents, and their first win in the format came against Ireland at the Vineyard in May 2009. The team has played most frequently against Ireland, in 13 matches, and defeated them in 11 matches. Pakistan has participated in all the editions of the ICC Women's World Twenty20. They lost all of their games in 2009 and 2010 editions, and in the 2012 edition, they registered their solitary win over India. Pakistan lost the final of the 2012 Women's Twenty20 Asia Cup to India by 18 runs. In the 2014 ICC Women's World Twenty20, Pakistan finished at seventh place defeating Sri Lanka by 14 runs in the playoffs.

Key

Test cricket

One Day International

Twenty20 International

References

External links

women's
Pakistan women's national cricket team